Mycoporopsis is a genus of fungi in the class Dothideomycetes. The relationship of this taxon to other taxa within the class is unknown (incertae sedis).

Species 

 Mycoporopsis abrothalloides
 Mycoporopsis californica
 Mycoporopsis deserticola
 Mycoporopsis exigua
 Mycoporopsis leucoplaca
 Mycoporopsis melacocca
 Mycoporopsis microscopica
 Mycoporopsis phaeosporizans
 Mycoporopsis pithyophila
 Mycoporopsis rappii
 Mycoporopsis roseola
 Mycoporopsis sorenocarpa
 Mycoporopsis tantilla
 Mycoporopsis tetramera
 Mycoporopsis vernicea

See also 
 List of Dothideomycetes genera incertae sedis

References

External links 
 Mycoporopsis at Index Fungorum

Dothideomycetes enigmatic taxa
Dothideomycetes genera
Taxa named by Johannes Müller Argoviensis